The Enchanted Castle is a children's fantasy novel by Edith Nesbit first published in 1907.

Plot summary

The enchanted castle of the title is a country estate in the West Country seen through the eyes of three children, Jerry, Jimmy, and Kathy, who discover it while exploring during the school holidays. The lake, groves and marble statues, with white towers and turrets in the distance, make a fairy-tale setting, and then in the middle of the maze in the rose garden, they find a sleeping fairy-tale princess.

The "princess" tells them that the castle is full of magic, and they almost believe her. She shows them the treasures of the castle, including a magic ring she says is a ring of invisibility, but when it actually turns her invisible she panics and admits that she is the housekeeper's niece, Mabel, and was just play-acting.

The children soon find that the ring has other magical powers such as making the "Ugly-Wugglies" (Guy Fawkes style dummies they had made to swell the audience at one of their play-performances) come to life. They eventually discover that the ring is actually granting their own wishes, and that the disturbing results stem from their failure to specify those wishes precisely.
 
The Enchanted Castle was written for both children and adults. It combines descriptions of the imaginative play of children, reminiscent of The Story of the Treasure Seekers, with a magic more muted than in her major fantasies such as The Story of the Amulet.

Adaptations

The Enchanted Castle was adapted into a TV-miniseries by the BBC in 1979. It has not been released on DVD or VHS in the UK: however, a DVD was released in Australia in 2013.

References

External links

 
 
 
 

1907 British novels
English novels
Children's fantasy novels
Novels by E. Nesbit
Fictional fortifications
Allen & Unwin books
1907 children's books
Books illustrated by H. R. Millar
Fictional buildings and structures originating in literature